Arul Kumar a/l Jambunathan is a Malaysian politician who has served as Political Secretary to the Minister of Transport Anthony Loke Siew Fook since January 2023 and Member of the Negeri Sembilan State Legislative Assembly (MLA) for Nilai since May 2013. He served as Member of the Negeri Sembilan State Executive Council (EXCO) in the Pakatan Harapan (PH) state administration under Menteri Besar Aminuddin Harun from May 2018 to his resignation in January 2023. He is a member of the Democratic Action Party (DAP), a component party of the PH coalition.

Election results

References 

Democratic Action Party (Malaysia) politicians
21st-century Malaysian politicians
Members of the Negeri Sembilan State Legislative Assembly
Negeri Sembilan state executive councillors
Living people
1985 births
People from Negeri Sembilan
Malaysian people of Indian descent